The 2006 FIFA World Cup European qualification playoffs were a set of home-and-away playoffs to decide the final three places granted to national football teams from European nations (more precisely, UEFA members) for the 2006 FIFA World Cup.

The playoffs were decided by the standard FIFA method of aggregate score, with away goals and, if necessary, extra time with the possibility of a penalty shootout at the end of the second leg. The winner of each playoff was awarded a place in the 2006 FIFA World Cup.

Qualified teams 
Because some groups had six teams and others had seven, matches against the 7th placed team were discarded. The two best ranked runners-up also qualified to the World Cup. The other six runners-up were drawn into three two-legged knock out matches.

Seeding and draw 
By the rules of the UEFA qualifying tournament, the first-place finishers in each of eight groups received automatic berths, along with the two second-place teams that had earned the most points against teams in the top six of their individual groups.

The six remaining second-place teams were divided into two pots based on their standings in the September 2005 FIFA World Rankings. The division was:

A draw was held on 14 October 2005 at FIFA headquarters in Zürich to pair each team from Pot 1 with a team from Pot 2. A second draw at the same time and location determined the order of the fixtures.

Matches 

|}

First leg

Second leg 

Czech Republic won 2–0 on aggregate.

4–4 on aggregate. Switzerland won on away goals.

Spain won 6–2 on aggregate.

References 

Playoff UEFA
Play
2005–06 in Slovak football
play
2005–06 in Turkish football
2005–06 in Swiss football
2005 in Norwegian football